Choman Hardi,(born 1974) is a Kurdish poet, translator and painter.

Background
She has published three volumes of poetry in Kurdish and two collections of English poems, Life for Us (Bloodaxe Books, 2004) and Considering the Women (Bloodaxe Books, 2015), which was shortlisted for the Forward Prize in 2016. Her articles have appeared in Modern Poetry in Translation

Career
She is a former chairperson of Exiled Writers Ink! and has organized creative writing workshops for the British Council in the UK, Belgium, Czech Republic and India. She is a former poet-in-residence at Moniack Mhor Writers' Centre (Scotland), Villa Hellebosch (Belgium), Hedgebrook Women Writers' Retreat (USA) and The Booth (Shetland). As an academic researcher, she has been a visiting scholar in The Centre for Multiethnic Research (Uppsala University), Zentrum Moderner Orient (Berlin) and The Department of Humanities of the University of Amsterdam. Between 2009 and 2011, she was a Senior Associate Member of St Anthony's College, Oxford. In 2014, she moved back to her home city of Sulaimani to take up a post at the American University of Iraq, becoming chair of the Department of English in 2015.

In 2015, she found Center for Gender and Development Studies (CGDS) at The American University of Iraq, Sulaimani. The center mainly focused on gender studies.

Books

See also
 Iraqi art
 Islamic art
 List of Iraqi artists

References

External links
Profile at the Poetry Archive with poems written and audio
Anna Battista, "5 Book Reviews", Erasing Clouds, issue 28, November 2004
Choman Hardi reading her poetry - a British Library recording, (audio) 27 May 2008
Life for Us by Choman Hardi. At Bloodaxe Books
"Choman Hardi", Exiled Writers
"An Interview with Choman Hardi", Textualities,  June 2005

1974 births
Living people
Alumni of the University of Oxford
Alumni of University College London
Alumni of the University of Kent
Uppsala University alumni
Kurdish poets